1 Undershaft, informally known as 'The Trellis' due to its external cross bracing, is a skyscraper planned for the City of London financial district which was given approval in November 2016. The scheme has been developed by Aroland Holdings and designed by Eric Parry Architects. It is set to replace the St Helen's tower and upon completion will become the second tallest skyscraper in London, and the United Kingdom.

The building is the second design for a skyscraper at 1 Undershaft, replacing a previous proposal designed by architects Avery Associates. The approved plans are also revised, reducing the height of the tower. Construction may not begin until several years after its approval date.

Background

Original proposal 

In January 2015, early plans emerged of a replacement office building for the St Helen's tower in Undershaft within London's Square Mile. The proposal, named 1 Undershaft, was designed by Avery Associates who began working on the scheme in collaboration with the then owner of the site Simon Halabi in 2010. At , it would have become the third tallest building in London and the United Kingdom behind The Shard and 22 Bishopsgate.

New proposal 
In July 2015, details of a revised scheme by the new owners of the site, Aroland Holdings, were reported. The plans were for a skyscraper of  designed by Eric Parry Architects. According to some reports, the design could be "modelled on Cleopatra's Needle".

Subject to planning permission, it was set to become the tallest building in the Square Mile when completed and the second tallest building in London and the United Kingdom behind The Shard. A consultation process took place in autumn 2015. On 8 February 2016, a planning application was submitted for the development, with a decision expected to be made in September 2016.

Each floor was reduced in height by 50 mm and structural floor beam depths were changed. In addition, the level of the soffit was decreased and the viewing gallery height reduced, which was intended to be double height. Despite its height reduction, the proposed height will still make 1 Undershaft the second tallest building in London and the United Kingdom upon completion.

Following a recommendation by planning officers for approval, the scheme was approved by the City of London Corporation on 28 November 2016, with 19 votes in support and two against and given final approval by Mayor of London Sadiq Khan on 12 December 2016. The start date for construction of the scheme has not yet been decided, but building work is expected to be finished anywhere between six and 10 years from its approval date, with demolition of the St Helen's building currently on the site expected to take 18 months and construction of 1 Undershaft due to take between three and four years.

Design 
The proposed skyscraper is rectangular in shape and slightly tapers as it gets higher. Developer Aroland Holdings originally wanted 1 Undershaft to be taller than the proposed height. However, the height has been limited by the Civil Aviation Authority (CAA) to avoid intruding on flight paths. In addition, the building's crown, which was intended to resemble Cleopatra's Needle, was not accepted by City planners who wanted "a less demonstrative top. They didn't want another overt shape".

To make room for the public space, the core will need to be positioned to the side of the tower. As a result, bronze-coloured diamond-shaped external cross-bracing will be required, giving the building its nickname The Trellis.

The top of the skyscraper is set to have London's highest viewing gallery free for public access (which could include a museum run by the Museum of London), and a restaurant.

See also 
List of tallest buildings and structures in London
List of tallest buildings in the United Kingdom

References

External links 
Avery Associates website Avery-Architects.co.uk
Eric Parry Architects website EricParryArchitects.co.uk

Buildings and structures in the City of London
Proposed skyscrapers in London
Redevelopment projects in London